The Kichatna Mountains are a small mountain range in the northwestern part of Matanuska-Susitna Borough of the U.S. state of Alaska, approximately  southwest of Denali.  Unlike the major snow peaks of much of the rest of the Alaska Range, the Kichatnas boast short, steep rock towers, which are famous both for their high-quality, highly technical climbing, and their terrible weather.

The main peaks of the Kichatnas include:
 Kichatna Spire, 8985 feet 
 Augustin Peak
 Gurney Peak, 8400 feet
 Middle Triple Peak, 8835 feet
 The Citadel, 8520 feet 

Named glaciers in the Kichatnas include
 Caldwell Glacier
 Cul-de-sac Glacier
 Fleischmann Glacier
 Shadows Glacier
 Shelf Glacier
 Tatina Glacier
Most of the glaciers originate from the Cathedral Spires arrête.

Gallery

References

Alaska Range
Mountains of Matanuska-Susitna Borough, Alaska